House of Spirits may refer to:
 The House of the Spirits, a 1982 novel by Isabel Allende
 The House of the Spirits (film), a 1993 film based on the book by Allende
 House of Spirits (TV series), a 2016 TVB drama starring Bobby Au-yeung and Nancy Wu